Prashant Prabhakar Jaiswal (born October 13, 1974) is a German actor of Indian origin. He has acted in several films, short films and TV-series. He has earned a lot of fame with his work in the award-winning TV series Stromberg. His role of Anupam Khan in the 11th episode of Season 23 of Alarm für Cobra 11, titled "Hooray for Bollywood", was very well received.

Biography 
Prashant Prabhakar Jaiswal was born in the Madhubani district of Bihar on October 13, 1974. In 2002, Prashant Prabhakar emigrated to Germany. In Göttingen, Lower Saxony he began to study social sciences. In addition to his studies, he was also keenly interested in acting. Idolizing Amitabh Bachchan, he decided to make a name for himself and has never turned back ever since. Since 2005, Prashant Prabhakar has participated in several German commercials, films, TV movies and -series. Thanks to his role as Co-worker Prashant in the well-known and award-winning TV series Stromberg, he became known to a wider audience in Germany, in which he participated since the second season.

Prashant Prabhakar lives in Göttingen. He is an active member of Bihar Fraternity, an organization representing the Bihari Diaspora living in Europe.

Filmography (selection) 
 2005: Crime Scene (Tatort), (TV series)
 2006: Aktenzeichen XY… ungelöst (TV series)
 2008: Angie (TV series)
 2009: Die Pfefferkörner (TV series)
 2009: Cologne P.D. (TV series)
 2009: Last Stop Toyland (Spielzeugland Endstation)
 2009: Desert Flower
 2010: Küss Dich Reich (TV movie)
 2010: Mit Herz und Handschellen (TV series)
 2010: Liebling, lass uns scheiden! (TV movie)
 2010: Toxic Lullaby
 2010: Fasten à la Carte (TV movie)
 2011: Lisas Fluch (TV movie)
 2011: 
 2011: Nightmare Fever (Alptraumfieber)
 2011: Aazaan
 2012: Stromberg (TV series, Appearance in 29 episodes from 2005 to 2012) 2012: Crime Scene (Tatort)'', (TV series)
 2012: Robin Hood: Ghosts of Sherwood
 2012: Agent Ranjid rettet die Welt

References

External links 
 
 Official website (German)

1974 births
Living people
German male film actors
German male stage actors
German male television actors
Indian emigrants to Germany